Two Moon Junction is a 1988 American erotic thriller romance film written and directed by Zalman King and starring Sherilyn Fenn and Richard Tyson. The original music score is composed by Jonathan Elias.

The film is noted for the final film appearances of Burl Ives and Hervé Villechaize, as well as the theatrical film debut of Milla Jovovich.

Plot
April Delongpre (Sherilyn Fenn) is the eldest daughter of a powerful Alabama senator and heiress to an old and respectable Southern family. After graduating from college, April returns home to her parents’ house for the summer to await her semiarranged marriage to her fiancé, Chad Douglas Fairchild (Martin Hewitt). When a carnival comes to the town, April and Chad accompany April's two younger sisters to the fairgrounds, where April sees from a distance a rugged carnival roustabout and drifter named Perry Tyson (Richard Tyson). When April accidentally leaves her purse behind in one of the rides, Perry returns it to her and introduces himself (after having looked inside and gotten April's name and home address). Intrigued by the mysterious drifter, April returns to the carnival that evening to talk with Perry, but she refuses his advances.

A few days later, while Chad is away for the weekend on business and her parents and siblings are also away, April begins a sordid affair with Perry when he shows up one morning at April's house and uses her shower. Despite telling him to leave, April cannot restrain her urges for Perry and the two of them have sex. April cries afterwards over it and Perry leaves.

The next day, April visits her grandmother Belle Delongpre (Louise Fletcher), April's confidante about her past infatuations. After April leaves, Belle asks the local sheriff Earl Hawkins (Burl Ives) to keep an eye on her.

April returns to the carnival that evening to see Perry, only to become dismayed and jealous when she finds him drunk and in the company of a fellow drifter and cowgirl who introduces herself as Patti Jean (Kristy McNichol) who takes April with her in Perry's truck for a "bourbon run" to get more hard liquor for him. During the drive, Patti rambles on about her life and hometown and clearly flirts with April. At the carnival, when a ride malfunctions and endangers the people on it, Perry gets into a brawl with other fairground workers. Patti Jean and April return and join in on the brawl until Perry's pet dog is killed by one of the workers and the rest of them order Perry and the women to leave.

After burying his dog in a field, April and Patti Jean take the depressed Perry out to a bar and pool hall where Patti Jean again flirts with April and invites her to dance with her. However, instead of taking advantage of April's curiosity, Patti urges her to go back to Perry and continue their tryst. After Patti Jean leaves town, Perry takes April on a ride on his motorcycle, where they check into a motel and have sex again.

In the morning, April leaves Perry to pick up her car, which she left behind at the fairgrounds after the carnival moves out, unaware that Sheriff Hawkins is following her. April returns to the motel and gets into a big argument with Perry when she catches him flirting with two motel housekeepers. To defuse their tension, she takes him out to have breakfast at a local restaurant, where she tells him more about her life and about a family property at the edge of a lake called the Two Moon Junction which is her childhood playground. However, April tells Perry that they must part ways, as she must return home and to her privileged life. After she leaves, Sheriff Hawkins appears and arrests Perry and then drives him to the state line and gives Perry an implied threat never to come around the area again.

A few weeks later, on the day before April's wedding, she has another encounter with Perry, who shows up to work at constructing the tents on her family's property for the wedding reception. He is also spotted by Belle, who threatens him to leave town and offers him a bribe, but Perry refuses to accept it. Belle then makes a call to Sheriff Hawkins to inform him that April's lover is back in town and to deal with it.

That evening, while Chad is having his bachelor party, April shows up at the Two Moon Junction, a run-down pavilion at the edge of a lake, where she meets Perry, who had left a message to meet him there. April offers Perry money to leave town and never return, but Perry again refuses and urges her to act out her fantasies that she has long suppressed since her childhood. April and Perry again make love, only for April to again cry and walk out on Perry for good to return to her life.

The next morning on the day of the wedding, as Perry is preparing to leave town, one of Sheriff Hawkins's deputies attempts to kill Perry, but he subdues the deputy and escapes. At the church, as April is preparing to walk down the aisle to the altar, Belle tries to persuade her not to abandon her privileged lifestyle and lies to her that Perry left town for a bribe. April does not believe her, but she nevertheless walks down the church aisle to marry Chad.

Sometime later, Perry is seen working as a dishwasher at a blues nightclub in another town. After work, as Perry returns to his motel room for the night to care and feed his new pet dog, he finds April in his bathroom taking a shower, reliving their first sexual encounter.

Perry joins April and they kiss. April, wearing Chad's wedding ring, makes love with Perry in the shower.

Main cast

Production
It was Richard Tyson's second film following Three O'Clock High. "It was magic to get cast in that role," he later said. "I was nice to a girl for the last time ever in a movie. I thought I did a good job. I get stopped for that too – all the time."

Zalman King said he cast Tyson because "I was looking for someone who was a teen idol. And he did have it in that movie, I thought. It was one of the few times that I could see his beauty, because I love the way his face looked. When I met him he was a football player and he was very beefy and drank a lot of beer. And I asked him to please lose weight and he did, and for that amount of time I thought he was very, very attractive... [His character] is out of a romance novel... It was romance, although not much of a plot, and that’s what I needed: someone who was bold and strong, and was cut and ripped, and he had charm—I don’t think he was everybody’s cup of tea, 100%, but I thought he fit quite well."

Sherilyn Fenn later said she thought the movie "felt really exploitative."

The film was shot throughout Los Angeles County, California, with the major sequences filmed at the Shambala Animal Preserve, which is owned and operated by actress Tippi Hedren.

Reception
On review aggregator Rotten Tomatoes, the film has a 0% approval rating based on 8 reviews.  On Metacritic, the film has a score of 38 out of 100 based on 11 critics, indicating "generally unfavorable reviews". Critics criticized the film's directing, plot, and dialogue.

Sequel
The film was followed seven years later by a sequel, Return to Two Moon Junction. Louise Fletcher was the only significant actor to reprise a role in the sequel.

Nominations
1988 Golden Raspberry Awards
Winner: Worst Supporting Actress - Kristy McNichol

References

External links

1988 films
American romantic drama films
1980s erotic drama films
1988 romantic drama films
1980s English-language films
Erotic romance films
American erotic drama films
American independent films
Films directed by Zalman King
Films scored by Jonathan Elias
1988 independent films
Golden Raspberry Award winning films
1988 directorial debut films
1980s American films